Allegory of Patience is a painting of  by Giorgio Vasari, with input from Michelangelo, for the Bishop of Arezzo Bernadetto Minerbetti.

Description
The painting depicts a personification of Patience. The semi-nude female figure, her arms held tight across her body perhaps in modesty or "huddling" and "shivering" in the cold, gazes down watching as a water clock slowly erodes a stone inscribed with the Latin  or "abiding patience", which is likely to be a reference to Cicero's De Inventione. The landscape behind, with buildings but unfigured, and in "frostbitten turquoise", is seen inverted by refraction in the water vessel. The figure's braided hair gleams in the light, against a backdrop of a moody and sombre sky. According to the National Gallery, "the monumentality of the figure and iridescent colours are indebted to Michelangelo"; Matthias Wivel (a curator at that gallery) highlights also the "emotional exposure [Michelangelo] espoused".

Correspondence
In a copy of a letter from the artist dated 14 November 1551 made by his nephew Giorgio Vasari the Younger, Vasari informed his patron Bernadetto Minerbetti, Bishop of Arezzo (Vasari's own home town), of his meetings with Michelangelo to agree a suitable representation of Patience. While the accompanying drawing is now lost, the letter describes in some detail a female figure "of middle age", half-clad so as to appear midway between Riches and Poverty, bound to a stone by her foot, "to give less offence to her more noble parts", but with her arms free, so that it is within her power to free herself, yet preferring instead to signal with them that she will wait till the water wears away the stone and thus sets her free. While in respect of the chain, the Allegory in the Palazzo Pitti first attributed to Vasari by Hermann Voss seemingly corresponds more closely to this vision, the presence of the Latin phrase (with a pentimento), selected with input from Annibale Caro, the very absence of physical bonds, emphasizing her choice and virtù, and the urn's clear function as a clepsydra help contribute to the identification.

Provenance
The painting was acquired by the investor Gary Klesch and his wife Anita and identified as Vasari's Allegory of Patience by Carlo Falciani, an art historian at the Accademia di Belle Arti di Firenze.

Gallery

See also
 Lives of the Most Excellent Painters, Sculptors, and Architects

Notes

References

External links
 Allegory of Patience (National Gallery)

1550s paintings
16th-century allegorical paintings
Paintings by Giorgio Vasari
Collections of the National Gallery, London